Arischa Conner (born October 18, 1971) is an American actress.

Early life 
Conner was born in Kingstree, South Carolina, and raised in Florence, South Carolina.

Career 
Arischa is best known for her recurring role as Leah Turner in the Hulu original series Dopesick. She also appeared in episodes of Swagger  and The Last Days of Ptolemy Grey.

Filmography

Film

Television

References

1971 births
Living people
American television actresses
21st-century American actresses